The 1924 Rice Owls football team was an American football team that represented Rice University as a member of the Southwest Conference (SWC) during the 1924 college football season. In its first season under head coach John Heisman, the team compiled a 4–4 record (2–2 against SWC opponents) and was outscored by a total of 85 to 69.

Schedule

References

Rice
Rice
Rice Owls football seasons
Rice Owls football